The 1869 Scarborough by-election occurred on 12 March 1869, due to the death of the incumbent Liberal MP Sir John Vanden-Bempde-Johnstone.  It was won by the unopposed Liberal candidate Sir Harcourt Vanden-Bempde-Johnstone.

References

Politics of the Borough of Scarborough
1869 elections in the United Kingdom
1869 in England
By-elections to the Parliament of the United Kingdom in North Yorkshire constituencies
Unopposed by-elections to the Parliament of the United Kingdom in English constituencies
19th century in Yorkshire
March 1869 events